Pero Fromarigues de Guimarães (c.1080-?) was a Portuguese nobleman, Lord of Melo.

Pero was the son of Fromarigo Guterres, great-grandson of Sueiro Belfaguer, and a descendant of the knights of Kingdom of León.

References

External links 
www.ricardocosta.com

11th-century Portuguese people
12th-century Portuguese people
Portuguese nobility
Portuguese Roman Catholics